Jemile Nykiwa Weeks (born January 26, 1987) is an American former professional baseball second baseman and outfielder. He has played in Major League Baseball (MLB) for the Oakland Athletics, Baltimore Orioles, Boston Red Sox, and San Diego Padres.

He is the younger brother of former MLB second baseman Rickie Weeks. He played college baseball at the University of Miami.

Amateur career
Weeks attended Lake Brantley High School in Altamonte Springs, Florida. At Altamonte Springs, Weeks hit .472 as a junior and led the team to a conference title, and also won All-State honors twice. Weeks also went 3-3 with a home run in the 2005 PlayStation All-America Baseball Game and played football for two seasons. Weeks then attended the University of Miami. As a freshman, Weeks hit .352 and was named a Louisville Slugger Freshman All-American. In his junior and final season for Miami, Weeks hit .363 with 13 home runs and a .641 slugging percentage.

Weeks was selected by the Milwaukee Brewers in the eighth round of the 2005 Major League Baseball draft, but he chose, instead, to attend the University of Miami. He played college baseball for the Miami Hurricanes.

Professional career

Oakland Athletics
The Oakland Athletics then selected him twelfth overall in the 2008 Major League Baseball Draft.

Weeks was batting .297 in nineteen games for the Kane County Cougars in 2008 when a torn hip flexor ended his season. He played fall ball with the Phoenix Desert Dogs in 2009, and was named an Arizona Fall League Rising Star. At the start of the 2010 season, Weeks was ranked seventh in Oakland's farm system according to Baseball America and appeared as a non-roster invitee for the Athletics in spring 2011.

He was called up to the majors for the first time on June 7, 2011. He won the MLB Rookie of the Month Award for the American League in June 2011. He batted .309, with seven doubles, three triples, six RBIs, and six stolen bases in this month.

In 2012, Weeks hit .220 with 14 doubles, 8 triples, 2 homers, 20 RBIs, 50 walks, and 15 stolen bases. On August 22, 2012, Weeks was demoted to the Triple-A's Sacramento River Cats when the A's activated outfielder Seth Smith and acquired Stephen Drew from the Arizona Diamondbacks.

Baltimore Orioles
On December 2, 2013, Weeks and a player to be named later (PTBNL) were traded to the Baltimore Orioles for pitcher Jim Johnson. The PTBNL was identified as David Freitas on December 12.

Boston Red Sox
The Orioles traded Weeks and Iván DeJesús, Jr. to the Boston Red Sox for Michael Almanzar and Kelly Johnson on August 30, 2014. On December 8, 2014, he was outrighted to AAA Pawtucket Red Sox.

San Diego Padres
The San Diego Padres signed Weeks to a minor league contract with an invitation to spring training in 2016. He began the season with the El Paso Chihuahuas of the Class AAA Pacific Coast League, and was promoted to the major leagues on April 20.
In 17 games with Padres, Weeks hit only .140 with 2 runs batted in and one stolen base.

Chicago Cubs
In December 2016, Weeks signed a minor league contract with the Chicago Cubs. In 63 games he hit .235 with 2 home runs and 24 runs batted in for the Iowa Cubs. He elected free agency on November 6, 2017.

Acereros de Monclova
On February 13, 2018, Weeks signed with the Acereros de Monclova of the Mexican Baseball League. He was released on July 3, 2018.

References

External links

1987 births
Living people
Aberdeen IronBirds players
Acereros de Monclova players
African-American baseball players
All-American college baseball players
American expatriate baseball players in Mexico
Arizona League Athletics players
Arizona League Padres players
Baltimore Orioles players
Baseball players from Orlando, Florida
Boston Red Sox players
El Paso Chihuahuas players
Gulf Coast Orioles players
Indios de Mayagüez players
Iowa Cubs players
Kane County Cougars players
Lake Brantley High School alumni
Lake Elsinore Storm players
Lowell Spinners players
Major League Baseball second basemen
Mexican League baseball center fielders
Miami Hurricanes baseball players
Midland RockHounds players
Norfolk Tides players
Oakland Athletics players
Pawtucket Red Sox players
Phoenix Desert Dogs players
Sacramento River Cats players
San Diego Padres players
Stockton Ports players
21st-century African-American sportspeople
20th-century African-American people